Əhmədabad and Akhmedabad may refer to:
Əhmədabad, Goranboy, Azerbaijan
Əhmədabad, Sabirabad, Azerbaijan
Əhmədabad, Tovuz, Azerbaijan
Ahmadabad-e Khanliq, Iran
Ahmadabad-e Owfan, Iran
Akhmedabad, Zanjan, Iran

See also
Ahmedabad
Ahmadabad (disambiguation)